Eugène Duflot de Mofras (born 5 July 1810, Toulouse, France—30 January 1884, Paris) was a 19th-century French naturalist, botanist, diplomat, and explorer.

He was the 7th son of Vost Cosme Nicolas Duflot and Anne Julie Mofras. In the latter 1830s he became an attaché of the French legation to Mexico.

Pacific Coast
In 1839 Duflot de Mofras was dispatched from his French legation post in Mexico City to explore the Pacific Coast of North America from 1840 to 1842, to access the Mexican Alta California and American Oregon Territory regions for French business interests.  He travelled along and documented the western coast of mainland Mexico, the Colorado River mouth, the Baja California Peninsula coasts, and the present day West Coast of the United States in California and Oregon.

While stationed at Yerba Buena (present day San Francisco), he traveled inland to see the Rancho New Helvetia agricultural colony of John Sutter. The 1848 discovery of gold on the rancho set off the California Gold Rush. Duflot de Mofras completed his journey in 1842.

Results
The report of Duflot de Mofras was significant at the time, and remains a detailed description of aspects of the northern Pacific Coast before American dominance.

He wrote in 1840 "…it is evident that California will belong to whatever nation chooses to send there a man-of-war and two hundred men."

His account was published in 1844 as the 2-volume work Exploration du territoire de l’Orégon, des Californies et de la mer Vermeille, exécutée pendant les années 1840, 1841 et 1842 (Exploring the Oregon Territory, California and the Pacific Coast), by the Arthus Bertrand press in Paris.

It recorded the commercial, political, and military significance of the regions, and activities of the Spanish, English, and Americans there. It includes descriptions of life at some of the Spanish missions in California, including the Mission San Carlos Borromeo de Carmelo and Mission Santa Cruz.

See also

References

External links
 
 Google Books: Exploration du territoire de l'Orégon, des Californies, et de la mer Vermeille  — complete scan of book, from the collection of New York Public Library.
 Biodiversitylibrary.org: Exploration du territoire de l'Orégon, des Californies, et de la mer Vermeille — title pages and high resolution period maps.

French botanical writers
French naturalists
1810 births
1884 deaths
Botanists active in California
French explorers of North America
Explorers of California
Explorers of Oregon
French diarists
French emigrants to Mexico
Foreign residents of Mexican California
History of the West Coast of the United States
Scientists from Toulouse
People of Oregon Territory
1840 in Alta California
1841 in Alta California
1842 in Alta California
1844 books
18th-century French botanists
19th-century French botanists
19th-century French diplomats
19th-century French writers
19th-century diarists